Phyllobrostis apathetica is a moth in the  family Lyonetiidae. It is only known from Pretoria, South Africa.

The wingspan is about 15 mm. The forewings are white and the hindwings are grey.

References

External links
Revision of the genus Phyllobrostis Staudinger, 1859 (Lepidoptera, Lyonetiidae)

Lyonetiidae
Moths of Africa
Moths described in 1921
Endemic moths of South Africa